Ido Shahar (born 20 August 2001) is an Israeli professional footballer who plays as a midfielder for Apollon Limassol, on loan from Maccabi Tel Aviv.

Honours

Club
Maccabi Tel Aviv
Toto Cup Al: 2020–21
Israel Super Cup: 2020Apollon Limassol'''
Cypriot Super Cup: 2022

References

External links
 
 

2001 births
Living people
Israeli footballers
Israeli Jews
Israel youth international footballers
Maccabi Tel Aviv F.C. players
Beitar Tel Aviv Bat Yam F.C. players
Hapoel Haifa F.C. players
Maccabi Petah Tikva F.C. players
Apollon Limassol FC players
Israeli Premier League players
Cypriot First Division players
Israeli expatriate footballers
Expatriate footballers in Cyprus
Israeli expatriate sportspeople in Cyprus
Footballers from Southern District (Israel)
Association football midfielders